Proletarsky is a rural locality (a khutor) in Kirovskoye Rural Settlement of Maykopsky District, Russia. The population was 1064 as of 2018. There are 10 streets.

Geography 
Proletarsky is located 17 km north of Tulsky (the district's administrative centre) by road. Mafekhabl is the nearest rural locality.

References 

Rural localities in Maykopsky District